Hauraki is a suburb of North Shore, Auckland.

Hauraki may also refer to the following in New Zealand:

Hauraki (New Zealand general electorate), a general electorate between 1928 and 1996
Hauraki (Māori electorate), a Māori electorate between 1999 and 2002
Hauraki-Waikato, a Māori electorate from 2008
Hauraki District, a municipality in the Waikato Region
Hauraki Plains, a flat area in the northern North Island
Hauraki Gulf, a coastal feature of the northern North Island
Radio Hauraki, a radio network